Sunrin Internet High School is an information technology-oriented vocational school in Seoul, South Korea.

History 
1899: The school was founded by Ōkura Kihachirō and built in cooperation with the Korean government in Myeong-dong, Seoul. Courses are offered for the agricultural, commercial, and industrial sectors.
1906: The commercial sector is spun off into a separate school called "Sunrin Commercial School".
1908: The first graduation was held.
1913: The school moved to Yongsan-gu, Seoul.

Department 
 Information protection
 Software
 Techno management
 Multimedia

Sources
Sunrin Internet High School
Tech Savvy Youth – Korea’s Efforts to Create a New Wired Generation

Education in Seoul
High schools in South Korea
Vocational education in South Korea